Tropospheric Emissions: Monitoring of Pollution (TEMPO) is a NASA Earth Venture-Instrument that will measure North American pollution at a high resolution and on an hourly basis. It is an ultraviolet–visible spectrometer maintaining a constant view of North America, enabling it to provide daily data on ozone, nitrogen dioxide, and other elements in the atmosphere.

TEMPO is intended to be attached as payload on a commercial geostationary communication satellite with a constant view of the face of the Earth. TEMPO's light-collecting mirror scans a complete and constant east to west field of regard (FOR). TEMPO detectors measure reflected sunlight to and from the Earth's surface and atmosphere. TEMPO "monitors air quality from Mexico to Canada" with "scientists from both Mexico and Canada sharing TEMPO activities taking place in their home countries". TEMPO will form part of a geostationary constellation of pollution-monitoring assets, along with the planned Sentinel-4 from ESA and Geostationary Environment Monitoring Spectrometer (GEMS) from South Korea's KARI.

On 3 February 2020, Intelsat announced that the Intelsat 40e satellite will host TEMPO. Maxar Technologies, the builder of the satellite, is responsible for payload integration. As of February 2023, the launch is scheduled for 7 April 2023.

Earth Venture-Instrument program
TEMPO, which is a collaboration between NASA and the Smithsonian Astrophysical Observatory, is NASA's first Earth Venture-Instrument (EVI) mission. The EVI program is an element within the Earth System Science Pathfinder (ESSP) program office, which is under NASA's Science Mission Directorate Earth Science Division (SMD/ESD). EVI's are a series of innovative "science-driven, competitively selected, low cost missions". The series of "Venture Class" missions were recommended in the 2007 publication Earth Science and Applications from Space: National Imperatives for the Next Decade and Beyond. "nnovative research and application missions that might address any area of Earth science" are selected through frequent "openly-competed solicitations".

Earth Venture missions are "small-sized competitively selected orbital missions and instrument missions of opportunity" and include NASA-ISRO Synthetic Aperture Radar (NISAR), Surface Water and Ocean Topography (SWOT), ICESat-2, SAGE III on ISS, Gravity Recovery and Climate Experiment Follow On (GRACE-FO), Cyclone Global Navigation Satellite System (CYGNSS), Ecosystem Spaceborne Thermal Radiometer Experiment on Space Station (ECOSTRESS), and the Global Ecosystem Dynamics Investigation lidar (GEDI).

References

External links
 TEMPO website by the Smithsonian Astrophysical Observatory

Satellite meteorology
Spacecraft instruments
Spectrometers
Piggyback mission
2023 in spaceflight